The Maritime Museum is a museum in São Lourenço, Macau, China.

History
The construction of the museum was proposed in 1986. The museum was finally opened in 1987. Because of space constraint, new museum building was constructed and opened on 24 June 1990.

Architecture
The museum building spans over 800 m2 of area and was built on the site where the first Portuguese explorers landed on Macau in 1553. The building resembles the shape of a ship.

Exhibitions
 Maritime Ethnology Exhibition
 Maritime History Exhibition
 Maritime Technology Exhibition
 Aquarium Gallery

See also
 List of museums in Macau

References

External links

 

1987 establishments in Macau
Museums established in 1987
Museums in Macau